First Impressions is an American television game show hosted by Dana Carvey and Freddie Prinze Jr. The series premiered on USA Network on May 10, 2016, and concluded on June 14, 2016.

Episodes

References

External links
 
 

2010s American game shows
2016 American television series debuts
2016 American television series endings
English-language television shows
USA Network original programming